Olena Pavlivna Mazurenko (born 24 October 1969) is a Ukrainian former footballer who played as a defender. She has been a member of the Ukraine women's national team.

References

1969 births
Living people
Footballers from Kyiv
Women's association football defenders
Ukrainian women's footballers
Ukraine women's international footballers
1. FC Nürnberg players
Ukrainian expatriate women's footballers
Ukrainian expatriate sportspeople in Germany
Expatriate women's footballers in Germany
Ukrainian expatriate sportspeople in Russia